Moose sickness is a degenerative condition that occurs in moose populations in central and eastern North America that have been infected with the parasitic worm Parelaphostrongylus tenuis. The disease is characterized by stumbling, aimlessness and other odd behavior and is often fatal.

The parasite is carried by white-tailed deer who are otherwise unaffected by it. The worm's life cycle is complex. To get the disease, a moose has to eat vegetation inhabited by snails or slugs that have come in contact with infected deer feces.

References
 

Ruminant diseases